Markita Uran Aldridge (born September 15, 1973) is an American retired basketball shooting guard. Aldridge played three seasons with the Washington Mystics from 1999 to 2001. During her time with Washington, she averaged 2.3 points, one rebound, and one assist per game over 10.6 minutes.

Aldridge attended University of North Carolina at Charlotte, where she played with the 49ers. She graduated from Charlotte in 1996.

Personal
In March 2017, Aldridge became the first former WNBA player appointed to the finance committee of the National Basketball Retired Players Association, which is the official alumni organization for multiple professional basketball leagues in the United States.

References

1973 births
Living people
American women's basketball players
Basketball players from Detroit
Charlotte 49ers women's basketball players
Columbus Quest players
Portland Power players
Richmond Rage players
Shooting guards
Martin Luther King High School (Detroit) alumni
Washington Mystics players